Jorge Porley (born 11 May 1963) is a Uruguayan boxer. He competed in the men's light middleweight event at the 1992 Summer Olympics.

References

1963 births
Living people
Uruguayan male boxers
Olympic boxers of Uruguay
Boxers at the 1992 Summer Olympics
Place of birth missing (living people)
Light-middleweight boxers